The Doftenița is a left tributary of the river Dofteana in Romania. It flows into the Dofteana in the village Dofteana.

References

Rivers of Romania
Rivers of Bacău County